A horn is a sound-making device that can be equipped to motor vehicles, buses, bicycles, trains, trams (otherwise known as streetcars in North America), and other types of vehicles. The sound made usually resembles a "honk" (older vehicles) or a "beep" (modern vehicles). The driver uses the horn to warn others of the vehicle's approach or presence, or to call attention to some hazard. Motor vehicles, ships and trains are required by law in some countries to have horns. Like trams, trolley cars and streetcars, bicycles are also legally required to have an audible warning device in many areas, but not universally, and not always a horn.

Types

Bicycle
Bicycles sometimes have a classic bulb horn, operated by squeezing a rubber bulb attached to a metal horn. Squeezing the bulb forces air through a steel reed located in the throat of the horn, making it vibrate, producing a single note. The flaring horn matches the acoustic impedance of the reed to the open air, radiating the sound waves efficiently, making the sound louder. Other types of horns used on bicycles include battery-operated horns (sometimes even car horns on 12-volt circuits are incorporated) and small air horns powered by a small can of compressed gas.

Motor vehicles

Car horns are usually electric, driven by a flat circular steel diaphragm that has an electromagnet acting on it in one direction and a spring pulling in the opposite direction. The diaphragm is attached to contact points that repeatedly interrupt the current to that electromagnet causing the diaphragm to spring back the other way, which completes the circuit again. This arrangement opens and closes the circuit hundreds of times per second, which creates a loud noise like a buzzer or electric bell, which sound enters a horn to be amplified. There is usually a screw to adjust the distance/tension of the electrical contacts for best operation. A spiral exponential horn shape (sometimes called the "snail") is cast into the body of the horn, to better match the acoustical impedance of the diaphragm with open air, and thus more effectively transfer the sound energy. Sound levels of typical car horns are approximately 107–109 decibels, and they typically draw 5–6 amperes of current.

Horns can be used singly, but are often arranged in pairs to produce an interval consisting of two notes, sounded together; although this doubles the sound volume, the use of two differing frequencies with their beat frequencies and missing fundamental is more perceptible than the use of two horns of identical frequency, particularly in an environment with a high ambient noise level. Typical frequencies of a pair of horns of this design are 500 Hz and 405–420 Hz (approximately B4 and G4, minor third).

Some cars, and many motor scooters or motorcycles, now use a cheaper and smaller alternative design, which, despite retaining the name "horn," abandons the actual horn ducting and instead relies on a larger flat diaphragm to reach the required sound level. Sound levels of such horns are approximately 109–112 decibels, and they typically draw 2.5–5 amperes of current. Again, these horns can be either single, or arranged in pairs; typical frequencies for a pair are 420–440 Hz and 340–370 Hz (approximately G4–A4 and F4–F4) for this design.

A horn grille is a part of some designs of car or other motor vehicle that has an electric horn, such as a motor scooter.

The radiators of modern cars no longer determine the shape of the grilles, which have become more abstract, the radiator being of different proportions from the grille and over 15 centimetres behind it. Now grilles are usually designed so the sound of a horn can readily come out through them. Those designs that echo the shape of the grille no longer have front fenders with rather large crevices that accommodate trumpet-shaped horns. Thus some cars, often British ones, have a pair of round horn grilles on either side of the radiator grille, with a horn behind each. A luxury car's horn grilles are usually chrome-plated.

Cars with rear engines, such as the Volkswagen Beetle and the early Porsches, necessarily have no radiator grilles in front, and so have horn grilles placed below their headlights. Some motor scooters have this feature as well, placed below the handlebars. Their horn grilles may be made of cheap plastic. These vehicles and the cheaper cars have only one horn.

Truck (lorry), and bus horns may be electrically operated and similar to car horns, but are often air horns driven by air from an air compressor, which many trucks and buses have in order to operate the air brakes. The compressor forces air past a diaphragm in the horn's throat, causing it to vibrate. Such air horns are often used as trim items, with chromed straight horns mounted on top of the cab. This design may also be installed on customised automobiles, using a small electrical compressor. Usually two or more are used, some drivers go so far as to install train horns. The frequencies vary to produce a variety of different chords, but in general are lower than those of automobile horns—125–180 Hz (approximately C3–G3). Sound levels are approximately 117–118 decibels.

Trains, trolleycars and trams/streetcars

Locomotives have train horns, which are air horns operated by compressed air from the train's  air brake system. To distinguish their sound from truck and bus air horns, train horns in the U.S. consist of groups of two to five horns (called "chimes") which have different notes, sounded together to form a chord. Trains typically cannot stop in time to avoid hitting obstructions and depend on being seen by the driver, so they rely on their horns to warn of their approach. Therefore, train horns are louder and lower in frequency than car horns, so that they can be heard at longer distances. The sound level is 146–175 dB. In Japan, most modern trains like 209 series or E233 series from the first half of the 1990s onwards use electric horns as primary in passenger use. Although electric horns were used by Seibu 2000 series, air horns were primarily used until the 1990s. Modern Japanese trains may still be equipped with both air horns and electric horns.

Most modern streetcars, trams and trolley cars including low-floor vehicles around the world also employ horns or whistles as a secondary auditory warning signal in addition to the gong/bell which either use the sound of air horns or electric automobile car horns.

Ships
Ships signal to each other and to the shore with air horns, sometimes called whistles, that are driven with compressed air or from steam tapped from the power plant. Traditionally, the lower the frequency, the larger the ship. The RMS Queen Mary, an ocean liner launched in 1934, had three horns based on 55 Hz (corresponding to A1 ), a frequency chosen because it was low enough that the very loud sound of it would not be painful to the passengers. For vessels between  the range is 130–350 Hz and for vessels under  it is 70–700 Hz.

Portable air horns driven by canned compressed air are used for small craft water safety, as well as for sports events and recreational activities.

As musical instrument
Various types of vehicle horns are used by percussionists as sound effects, or even melodically, in musical works. For example, George Gershwin's 1928 orchestral work An American in Paris calls for the use of 4 taxi horns. György Ligeti's opera Le Grand Macabre features two "Car Horn Preludes" scored for 12 bulb horns, each one tuned to a specific pitch.

Klaxon 

A Klaxon is a type of an electromechanical horn or alerting device. Mainly used on cars, trains and ships, they produce an easily identifiable sound, often transcribed onomatopoeiacally in English as "awooga". Like most mechanical horns, they have largely been replaced by solid-state electronic alarms, though the memorable tone has persisted. Klaxon was originally a brand name.

The klaxon horn's characteristic sound is produced by a spring-steel diaphragm with a rivet in the center that is repeatedly struck by the teeth of a rotating cogwheel. The diaphragm is attached to a horn that acts as an acoustic transformer and controls the direction of the sound.

In the first klaxons, the wheel was driven either by hand or by an electric motor. American inventor Miller Reese Hutchison (later chief engineer of Thomas Edison) patented the mechanism in 1908.
The Lovell-McConnell Manufacturing Company of Newark, New Jersey bought the rights to the device and it became standard equipment on General Motors cars. Franklyn Hallett Lovell Jr., the founder, coined the name klaxon from the Ancient Greek verb klazō, "I shriek".

Klaxons were first fitted to automobiles and bicycles in 1908. They were originally powered by six-volt dry cells, and from 1911 by rechargeable batteries. Later hand-powered versions were used as military evacuation alarms and factory sirens. They were also used as submarine dive and surface alarms beginning in the Second World War.

The klaxophone is a musical instrument that makes use of the klaxon's unique sound.

The English company Klaxon Signals Ltd. has been based in Oldham, England for the last 80 years, with premises also in Birmingham. The French Klaxon company was acquired by the Italian Fiamm Group in the 1990s. In 2005 Klaxon Signals sold the rights for the hooter or klaxon range to Moflash Signalling Ltd., based in the original Klaxon Factory in Birmingham, England. The Famous Klaxet ES and A1 hooter returned home to Birmingham after ten years.

The Moflash Company discontinued the Klaxet hooter in 2013, but continued to produce the A1 hooter, the only original Klaxon left in production.

Several languages have either borrowed or transcribed the name into their lexicons. In Japanese, the word  refers to car horns in general. This is also true in languages such as French, Italian, Greek, Dutch, Russian, Polish, Spanish, Romanian, Czech, Turkish, Indonesian, and Korean.

The word Klaxon is often used in British game shows like Who Wants to Be a Millionaire? on which on the final part of each program, if a contestant answers a question correctly and if the production team can't continue the game on the same episode, a musical chord produced by brass instruments sounds to stop the show. Some international hosts will call it the "hooter" or "the horn" or simply say "That sound means we're out of time for today."

Regulation

In countries applying the Vienna Convention on Road Traffic, usage of audible warnings is limited, and allowed only in two cases:
 to avoid an accident; 
 outside built-up areas to warn a driver that they are about to be overtaken.

See also
Bicycle bell
 Civil defense siren
Vehicle-mounted siren
Vehicle-mounted whistle

References

External links

Authentic Navy Alarm Sounds
Pages from a klaxon horn adjustment manual with diagrams

Sound production
Vehicle parts

de:Hupe